The following highways are numbered 167:

Canada
 Prince Edward Island Route 167
 Quebec Route 167
 Saskatchewan Highway 167

Costa Rica
 National Route 167

India
 National Highway 167 (India)

Japan
 Japan National Route 167

United States
 U.S. Route 167
 Alabama State Route 167
 California State Route 167
 Connecticut Route 167
 Florida State Road 167 (former)
 Georgia State Route 167 (former)
 Illinois Route 167
 Indiana State Road 167
 K-167 (Kansas highway)
 Kentucky Route 167
 Maine State Route 167
 M-167 (Michigan highway) (former)
 Nevada State Route 167 (former)
 New Jersey Route 167 
 New York State Route 167
 Ohio State Route 167
 Oklahoma State Highway 167
 Pennsylvania Route 167
 Tennessee State Route 167 
 Texas State Highway 167 (former)
 Utah State Route 167
 Washington State Route 167
 Wisconsin Highway 167
Territories:
 Puerto Rico Highway 167